The Wimberger's sign, also called Wimberger's corner sign, refers to localized bilateral metaphyseal destruction of the medial proximal tibia. It is a pathognomonic sign for congenital syphilis.

References

Further reading
 Wimberger H. Klinisch-radiologische Diagnostik v. Rachitis, Scorbut u. Lues im Kindesalter. Ergebn. d. inner. Med. u. Kinderheilkunde. 1925;28:264.
 Caffey J. Pediatric X-ray diagnosis, a textbook for students and practitioners of pediatrics, surgery and radiology. Chicago, The Year Book Publishers, Inc., 1945.

Infections specific to the perinatal period
Symptoms and signs: musculoskeletal system
Syphilis
Tibia